Bruno Landi may refer to:
 Bruno Landi (tenor)
 Bruno Landi (cyclist)